In differential geometry, given a spin structure on an -dimensional orientable Riemannian manifold  one defines the spinor bundle to be the complex vector bundle  associated to the corresponding principal bundle  of spin frames over  and the spin representation of its structure group  on the space of spinors .

A section of the spinor bundle  is called a spinor field.

Formal definition

Let  be a spin structure on a Riemannian manifold that is, an equivariant lift of the oriented orthonormal frame bundle  with respect to the double covering  of the special orthogonal group by the spin group.

The spinor bundle  is defined  to be the complex vector bundle

associated to the spin structure  via the spin representation  where  denotes the group of unitary operators acting on a Hilbert space  It is worth noting that the spin representation  is a faithful and unitary representation of the group

See also

 Clifford bundle
 Clifford module bundle
 Orthonormal frame bundle
 Spin geometry
 Spinor
 Spinor representation

Notes

Further reading

 
 

|

Algebraic topology
Riemannian geometry
Structures on manifolds